Samacasa (possibly from Aymara sama color, Quechua sama rest, break, q'asa mountain pass) is a mountain in the Chila mountain range in the Andes of Peru, about  high. It is located in the Arequipa Region, Castilla Province, Chachas District. Samacasa lies north of Airicoto.

References

Mountains of Peru
Mountains of Arequipa Region